Wonjong of Goryeo (1219–1274) was the 24th king of Goryeo.

Wonjong can also refer to:
 Prince Jeongwon, also known by his temple name, Wonjong of Joseon.
 Bak Wonjong (1467-1510), Yeonguijeong under King Jungjong of Joseon.